The singles discography of Kitty Wells, an American country artist, consists of ninety singles, nineteen B-sides, and two music videos. In 1949 she was signed to RCA Victor Records, where she released her debut single, "Death at the Bar" also in 1949. Dropped from RCA in 1950, Wells signed with Decca Records and released the single "It Wasn't God Who Made Honky Tonk Angels" in 1952. The song was an answer song to Hank Thompson's hit, "The Wild Side of Life", spending six weeks at number one on the Billboard Magazine Hot C&W Sides chart. The single sold one million copies and made Wells the first female country artist to have a single reach number one on the Billboard country list. Until the end of the decade, Wells became the only woman on the country chart that would consistently receive radio airplay. In 1953 the song, "Paying for That Back Street Affair" reached #6 on the Billboard Hot C&W Sides list, as well as twenty one additional Top Ten singles on the same chart between 1953 and 1959. This included singles such as the Red Foley duet "One by One" (1954), "Making Believe" (1955), "I Can't Stop Loving You" (1958), "Mommy for a Day" (1959), and "Amigo's Guitar" (1959). The latter song was written by Wells herself and later won her a BMI Songwriter's Award.

In 1961, Wells had her second number one single with "Heartbreak U.S.A.", and an album of the same name was later released that year. During the decade, Wells had eleven more singles that would become Top Ten hits. In 1962 all three of her singles reached the Top Ten: "Unloved, Unwanted", "Will Your Lawyer Talk to God", and "We Missed You". She had her final major hit with 1966's "It's All Over But the Crying", which went to #14 on the Billboard Hot Country Singles chart. Wells continued recording for Decca until 1975, however most of her singles began to remain absent from the country chart. In 1975 she released three singles from her album, Forever Young, however none of them were successful. In 1979 she and her husband Johnnie Wright formed the label Rubocca Records, where she released the single "Thank You for the Roses" (1979), which peaked at #60 on the Hot Country Singles chart and became her final solo single to chart.

Singles

1940s and 1950s

1960s

1970s and 1980s

Other singles

Collaborative singles

Guest singles

Charted B-sides

Music videos

References 

Discographies of American artists
Country music discographies